Anastasia Dzyundzyak (born 26 March 1979) is a former Uzbekistani artistic gymnast. She competed at the 1996 Summer Olympics.

See also 
 List of Olympic female artistic gymnasts for Uzbekistan

References 

1979 births
Living people
Uzbekistani female artistic gymnasts
Gymnasts at the 1996 Summer Olympics
Olympic gymnasts of Uzbekistan
Sportspeople from Tashkent
Gymnasts at the 1994 Asian Games
Gymnasts at the 1998 Asian Games
Asian Games competitors for Uzbekistan
Place of birth missing (living people)
20th-century Uzbekistani women